Lartet is a surname. Notable people with the surname include:

 Édouard Lartet (1801–1871), French geologist and paleontologist
 Louis Lartet (1840–1899), French geologist and paleontologist, son of Édouard

See also
 Larter